Harari may refer to: 

 Harari people, Ethiopia
 Harari language, an Ethiopian Semitic language
 Harari Region, a state in Ethiopia
 Harari (surname), of multiple origins
 Yuval Noah Harari, an Israeli historian
 Harari Rishon Model, a model in physics named after Haim Harari

See also 
 Mbare, formerly Harari, a township in Zimbabwe
 Harari, an Afro-soul band led by Sipho Mabuse ("Hotstix")
 Hariri (disambiguation)

Language and nationality disambiguation pages